Charles Bell Jr. (born February 11, 1961, Pittsburgh, Pennsylvania), better known by his stage name Poogie Bell, is an American jazz drummer, composer, band leader and producer. Bell is best known as a drummer, working extensively with bassists Marcus Miller and as a sideman for other artists such as Erykah Badu, Victor Bailey, David Bowie, Stanley Clarke, Randy Crawford, Roberta Flack, Al Jarreau, Chaka Khan, Angelique Kidjo, Joe Sample, David Sanborn, John Scofield, Stanley Turrentine, Luther Vandross, Vanessa Williams, and Victor Wooten.

Life and career

Early life
Bell was born in 1961 in Pittsburgh, Pennsylvania to Charles Bell, Sr. and Alice Pittrell. His father was a jazz pianist, band leader for the Charles Bell Contemporary Jazz Quartet. As an infant, Bell regularly watched his father's band rehearse. He made his concert debut with his father's band at age two and a half, playing at Carnegie Music Hall, Pittsburgh, and in 1966, he performed with Pearl Bailey on the Mike Douglas Show.

Bell moved to New York with his family, where his father took up a music professorship. In New York, Bell continued to be immersed in the world of music. His father regularly rehearsed at home with Ron Carter, Richard Davis, Ornette Coleman, Max Roach, and Mary Lou Williams, and the bassist Paul Chambers was a neighbor. While growing up in New York, Bell was friends with Omar Hakim, Weldon Irvine, Marcus Miller, Lenny White, and Bernard Wright, all of whom went on to professional music careers of their own.

Professional career
Bell has an extensive discography as a sideman, producer and arranger. 
He produced Alex Bugnon, smooth jazz artist Mey, pop and R&B artist Kenji Hino, jazz bassist
owner of Yuji Sound Records and promotion company Poogie Bell Presents, LLC.

Grammy Awards
Bell performed on Chaka Khan's 1992 album The Woman I Am, which won the 1993 Grammy Award for Best Female R&B Vocal Performance and on Marcus Miller's album M2, which won the 2001 Best Contemporary Jazz Album. He also performed on Angélique Kidjo's 2007 release Djin Djin, which won the Grammy Award for Best Contemporary World Music Album in 2008.

Videos
Poogie Bell Interview

Discography
2004: Poogie Bell Band – Thinking Outside The Box
2007: Poogie Bell Band – Get on the Kit
2009: Poogie Bell Band – Poogie on Shuffle
2010: Poogie Bell Band – My America
2013: Poogie Bell Band – Suga Top

As a sideman
1979: Weldon Irvine – The Sisters 
1980: Weldon Irvine – Weldon & The Kats
1981: Bobby Broom – Clean Sweep
1991: Marcus Miller – Out of the World
1992: Chaka Khan – The Woman I Am
1992: Najee – Just An Illusion
1993: Kirk Whalum – Caché
1993: Marcus Miller – The Sun Don't Lie
1995: Marcus Miller – Tales
1996: Various Artists – World Christmas
1997: Marcus Miller – Live & More
1997: Erykah Badu - "Erykah Badu: Live"
1998: Marcus Miller – The Best of Marcus Miller
1999: Various Artists – An American Love Story
2001: Marcus Miller – M² (2002 Grammy Award for Best Contemporary Jazz Album)
2002: Marcus Miller – The Ozell Tapes – Live 2001
2003: Michael 'Patches' Stewart – Blow
2004: Dean Brown – Groove Warrior
2005: Marcus Miller – Master of All Trades
2005: Marcus Miller – Silver Rain
2007: Angelique Kidgo - Djin Djin (nominated for Grammy Award for Best Contemporary World Music Album)
2008: Marcus Miller – Marcus
2008: S.M.V. – Thunder
2010: Marcus Miller – A Night in Monte Carlo – Live 2009

References

External links

Sofia Echo interview
Poogie Bell Trio in Marseille
Crush Drum Artist
Poogie Bell video interview at Rockyoumentally

American jazz composers
American male jazz composers
American jazz drummers
American session musicians
1961 births
Living people
Jazz musicians from New York (state)
Musicians from New York City
Musicians from Pittsburgh
20th-century American drummers
American male drummers
Jazz musicians from Pennsylvania
20th-century American male musicians